The 3900 class are a class of electric locomotives built by Walkers Limited, Maryborough for Queensland Rail between 1988 and 1990.

History
In July 1984, a joint venture of Clyde Engineering and Walkers Limited was awarded a contract to build 70 3500/3600 class electric locomotives with ASEA supplying the electrical equipment. These were ordered to operate coal trains on the Blackwater and Goonyella railway lines that were in the process of being electrified. The contract was later extended to 80.

The bodies being built and assembled at Walkers's Maryborough factory with Clyde Engineering responsible for some of the electrical equipment and commissioning the locomotives.

Following the decision to electrify the North Coast line from Brisbane to Rockhampton, the last 30 were built to a modified design for passenger and general freight use, and delivered as the 3900 class.

3550 class
With an increased need for locomotives on the Central Queensland coal lines, 19 were converted to 3550 class locomotives.

References

Aurizon electric locomotives
Bo-Bo-Bo locomotives
Queensland Rail locomotives
Railway locomotives introduced in 1988
Walkers Limited locomotives
3 ft 6 in gauge locomotives of Australia
25 kV AC locomotives